Depreissia is a genus of jumping spiders that was first described by R. de Lessert in 1942.  it contains only two species, found only in the Congo and on Borneo: D. decipiens and D. myrmex.

References

Further reading
  (2003): Notes on Depreissia myrmex Lessert, 1942 (Araneae: Salticidae). Folia entomologica hungarica 64: 345-347.

Salticidae genera
Invertebrates of the Democratic Republic of the Congo
Salticidae
Spiders of Africa
Spiders of Asia